Dušan Mladenović may refer to:

Dušan Mladenović (footballer, born 1990), Serbian association football player
Dušan Mladenović (footballer, born 1995), Serbian association football player